FOC Farsta is a Swedish sports club located in the Farsta district of Stockholm, Sweden.

Background
The club was founded on 1 November 1977 through the merger of Farsta AIK and IF Cobran, hence the abbreviation FoC for “Farsta och Cobran.“ The club provides for bandy, bowling, football and ice hockey. The club's representative women's ice hockey were the Swedish Champions in 1995 and 1997.

Since their foundation, FOC Farsta's men's representative football team has participated mainly in the lower divisions of the Swedish football league system before gaining promotion to Division 2 at the end of the 2009 season. The club currently plays in Division 2 Södra Svealand which is the fourth tier of Swedish football. They play their home matches at the Farsta IP in Farsta.

The club is affiliated to the Stockholms Fotbollförbund.

In 2019, the departments of FoC Farsta were split into three separate associations: the football department took the name FOC Farsta Fotbollsförening (FOC Farsta FF), the hockey department became FOC Farsta Ishockeyförening (FOC Farsta IF), and the bowling department became the Farsta Bowlingklubb.

Season to season

External links
 FOC Farsta – Official Website 
 FOC Farsta Fotboll – Official Website (in Swedish)
 FoC Farsta Ishockey (in Swedish)

References

Football clubs in Stockholm
Bandy clubs in Sweden
Association football clubs established in 1977
Bandy clubs established in 1977
1977 establishments in Sweden